The Owners is a 2014 Kazakhstani black comedy-drama film directed by Adilkhan Yerzhanov. It was screened in the Contemporary World Cinema section at the 2014 Toronto International Film Festival.

Cast
 Yerbolat Yerzhan
 Aidyn Sakhaman
 Aliya Zainalova

References

External links
 

2014 films
2014 black comedy films
2014 comedy-drama films
2014 comedy films
Kazakhstani comedy films
Kazakh-language films